Cyptocephala is a genus of shield bugs in the tribe Pentatomini.

References

External links 
 

Pentatomidae genera
Pentatomini